"Style" is a song by American singer-songwriter Taylor Swift, taken from her fifth studio album, 1989 (2014). The song was written by Swift and with its producers Max Martin, Shellback, and Ali Payami. "Style" was released to radio stations as the album's third single on February 9, 2015, by Republic Records in partnership with Big Machine. Musically, the song incorporates funk-pop, pop rock and synth-pop, featuring heavy synthesizers, vocal reverberation, and a disco-tinged groove. The lyrics are about an unhealthy relationship from which a couple could not escape, because they are never "out of style".

The song received positive reviews from critics, many of whom deemed it the album's highlight. The song was nominated for International Work of the Year at the APRA Music Awards, and appeared on year-end lists by Pitchfork (2014) and Pazz & Jop (2015). In the US, "Style" peaked at number six on the Billboard Hot 100, becoming 1989s third consecutive Hot 100 top-ten single. It was certified triple platinum by the Recording Industry Association of America (RIAA). "Style" also entered the top ten on charts and received multi-platinum certifications in Australia and Canada.

Filmmaker Kyle Newman directed the song's music video featuring actor Dominic Sherwood as Swift's love interest. Premiering on February 13, 2015, the video featured a darker and more abstract atmosphere compared to those for previous 1989 singles "Shake It Off" and "Blank Space". Swift included "Style" on regular set lists for three of her world tours: the 1989 World Tour (2015), the Reputation Stadium Tour (2018), and the Eras Tour (2023).

Production and release

Inspired by pop music of the 1980s and its experimentation with synthesizers, drum pads, and overlapped vocals, Taylor Swift decided to move away from the signature country styles of her previous releases and incorporate a straightforward pop production for her fifth studio album, 1989. The recording process began in mid-2013 concurrently with the start of Swift's headlining world tour in support of her fourth studio album Red. Swift announced in February 2014 that she was working again with Max Martin and Shellback, with whom she had collaborated on three songs for Red. The two produced seven of the 13 tracks for the album's standard edition; Martin also served as executive producer with Swift.

"Style" was originally written by producer Ali Payami and guitarist Niklas Ljungfelt for themselves. The two finished the instrumentala guitar-driven track inspired by what Ljungfelt called "funky electronic music" artists such as Daft Punk. Payami played the instrumental for Martin at the latter's studio; Swift became fond of the track after overhearing it and decided to record it for her album. Swift, Payami, Martin, and Shellback are credited as the song's writers. Production was handled by all the songwriters except Swift. Michael Illbert and Sam Holland recorded the track at MXM Studios in Stockholm and Conway Recording Studios in Los Angeles, with assistance from Cory Bice. The song was mixed by Serban Ghenea and John Hanes at MixStar Studios in Virginia Beach and mastered by Tom Coyne at Sterling Sound in New York City. "Style" was one of the last songs finished by the production team for 1989.

The song debuted as a snippet in a Target commercial for the album on October 22, 2014. On December 28, 2014, Scott Borchetta, CEO of Swift's former record label Big Machine held an impromptu Q&A via Twitter. When asked by a fan about 1989s upcoming single following "Shake It Off" and "Blank Space", Borchetta responded that he was in favor of "Style". On February 9, 2015, Republic Records, in partnership with Big Machine, serviced the track to US hot adult contemporary radio as the third single. The following day, Republic serviced "Style" to US contemporary hit and rhythmic contemporary radio. The song was released to Italy's contemporary hit radio on April 3, 2015.

Music and lyrics

"Style" is primarily a synth-pop song. Jason Lipshutz of Billboard characterized "Style" as a pop rock song, while the Los Angeles Timess Mikael Wood and The Observers Kitty Empire described the track's style as "funk-pop". The refrain's first half is built on D and G major chords that create a relatively radiant atmosphere. The second half incorporates a B minor chord that evokes a glimpse of sorrow. Like the rest of 1989, the track uses heavy synthesizers, vocal reverberation and features an upbeat production, a dramatic change from Swift's trademark country styles. Times Sam Lansky wrote that "Style" has a 1970s disco-tinged groove. The refrain is accompanied by pulsating keyboards underneath. Alexis Petridis of The Guardian compared the song's electronic-oriented styles to those on the soundtrack of the 2011 film Drive and Daft Punk's 2013 album Random Access Memories.

The song's lyrics are ambiguous. Several critics initially thought the song talked about romance and beauty standards in a flirtatious manner. Wood pointed out the opening lines "Midnight / You come and pick me up, no headlights" as an allusion to having sex, a subject about which Swift had not previously written. The lyrics, "You've got that James Dean daydream look in your eye / And I've got that red lip classic thing that you like" in the refrain refer to the 1950s actor James Dean and, in the words of The Atlantics Spencer Kornhaber, reflect conventional beauty standards employed by iconic American figures like Marilyn Monroe and Cindy Crawford. Kornhaber remarked that the "classic" beauty in the lyrics are embedded with racial undertones, and Consequence of Sounds Sasha Geffen explicitly said it mostly applies to white people.

Slates Forrest Wickman noticed that the song seems to be about "timeless fashions" but actually portrays an unhealthy relationship. During an iHeartRadio live concert on October 27, 2014, Swift said the song's inspiration was a relationship that reminisced "fashion staples that ... we never throw out of our closet". Four days later, during a radio interview with host Ryan Seacrest, she explained that "Style" was inspired by one of her romantic affairs that was "always a bit off", and represented her evolved viewpoints on past relationships by admitting wrongdoings of both sides instead of her "I was right, you were wrong" mindset in previous songs. The lines that suggest Swift's self-asserted maturity are in the second pre-chorus, where she confesses to her unfaithful lover that she too has cheated.
I say, "I heard that you've been out and about with some other girl"He says, "What you've heard is true, but I,Can't stop thinking about you and I"I said, "I've been there too a few times"

Critical reception

"Style" received positive reviews from music critics. Kitty Empire from The Observer called it a "percolating" song that "satisfies on every level". PopMatterss Corey Beasley was impressed by Swift's departure from country to new styles that "fit her like a cashmere-lined leather glove" and deemed the song "immaculate". Nows Benjamin Boles selected "Style" as the album's highlight. Houston Chronicle writer Joey Guerra praised the song as "compelling". Mikael Wood of the Los Angeles Times also named the track the album's standout for its "sensual" atmosphere. Robert Leedham of Drowned in Sound praised the track's theme of celebrating past relationships and embracing positivity instead of Swift's traditional "[playing] the victim."

The New York Times critic Jon Caramanica labelled "Style" the "high mark" of 1989 that embodies Swift's "savage, wry, and pointed" maturity from her previous albums. Billboards Richard S. He praised "Style" for showcasing "Swift's songwriting at its purest" by evoking "worlds of emotion" despite utilizing a generic song structure. The Independents Andy Gill described the song's theme as a "piquancy", and its music direction as "desperately inclusive electropop grooves and corporate rebel clichés". Allie Volpe of The Philadelphia Inquirer viewed the song's lyrics as "shallow" but complimented its sound as her "favorite on the album." Consequence of Sounds Sasha Geffen lauded the song's musical styles, but criticized its theme of conventional beauty standards of "white people" as a cliché that blemishes Swift's "girl-next-door likability" on the album.

Pitchfork ranked "Style" at number 50 on their list of 2014's best songs. On behalf of the publication, Jordan Sargent remarked that while the lyrics embraced Swift's "familiar tropes of Western romance" on previous releases, the instrumentation as well as Swift's "tense and restrained" vocals signaled her transformation in music and image. The song placed at number 24 on the 2015 Pazz & Jop poll, an annual mass critics' poll conducted by The Village Voice. At the 2016 BMI Awards, the track was one of the Award-Winning Songs that earned Swift the honor of Songwriter of the Year. "Style" also received a nomination for International Work of the Year at the APRA Music Awards of 2016. In 2020, Hannah Mylrea of NME placed the song among the 10 best songs by Swift, labelling it as "Swift at her best". In 2021, Clash critics picked "Style" as one of Swift's 15 best songs.

Commercial performance

"Style" debuted at number 60 on the US Billboard Hot 100 chart of November 15, 2014, following the release of its parent album 1989. Following Swift's performance of "Style" at the 2014 Victoria's Secret Fashion Show, the song re-entered the chart at number 75 on the issue date December 27, 2014. After Borchetta announced that "Style" would likely be released as a single in December 2014, the track debuted at number 39 on Billboard Mainstream Top 40 (Pop Songs) chart dated January 12, 2015. The single reached number ten on the Hot 100 chart on February 28, 2015, becoming 1989s third consecutive Hot 100 top ten following the number-one singles "Shake It Off" and "Blank Space". It peaked at number six on the March 21, 2015, chart.

The single also achieved success on Billboard component charts, peaking atop the Mainstream Top 40, Adult Top 40, and the Adult Contemporary charts. "Style" was the seventh-best-performing song on the Billboard Radio Songs chart of 2015, earning over 3.163 billion audience impressions from 550,000 plays throughout the year. It has received 3x platinum certification by the Recording Industry Association of America (RIAA), which denotes track-equivalent sales of three million units based on sales and streams. By November 2017, "Style" had sold 2.2 million digital copies in the US.

In Canada, the single peaked at number six on the Canadian Hot 100 and has received 3x platinum certification by Music Canada (MC). "Style" achieved moderate success in Europe, charting in the top twenty on the national charts in Scotland (nine), the Czech Republic (11), Poland (13), Slovakia (14), and Hungary (18). The single reached number 21 on the UK Singles Chart and has received a platinum certification from the British Phonographic Industry (BPI), which denotes track-equivalent sales and streams of 600,000. It was more commercially successful in Oceania, peaking at number eight and 11 on the Australian and New Zealand charts, respectively. The track has been certified double platinum by the Australian Recording Industry Association (ARIA), and gold by the Recorded Music NZ (RMNZ). It also peaked atop the South African music chart.

Music video

American filmmaker Kyle Newman directed the music video for "Style", which was shot in Los Angeles and completed within four days in summer 2014. Before its release, Swift posted several teaser images and short clips from the video on her social media accounts. She planned to premiere the video on Good Morning America on the morning of February 13, 2015, but Canadian music channel Much released it at midnight. Swift uploaded the video to her Vevo account on the same day. In the video, English actor Dominic Sherwood plays Swift's love interest. Swift contacted him by text message roughly a month before the shooting; the two had known of each other through mutual friends. By the time they worked on the video, Sherwood had finished the film Take Down, which was later renamed Billionaire Ransom (released in 2016).

The video does not have a clear narrative but features disparate flashbacks of Swift and her love interest by the seashore, in the woods, and on car rides. At some points, the broken mirror pieces, through which Swift and her lover see each other, symbolize memories of a past relationship that linger on. Media publications noted and praised the video's darker, more abstract and sensual atmosphere compared to the videos for "Shake It Off" and "Blank Space". Vox's Kelsey McKinney opined that Swift embraced her sexuality using "sensual imagery" of her touching herself, which showcased her maturity as an artist. Emilee Lindner of MTV called the video "mature, tasteful, and ... sexy". Spence Kornhaber from The Atlantic, meanwhile, remarked that Swift expressed her sexuality in a more conservative manner compared to her contemporaries that distinguished her from "the pop obsession with women's bodies." InStyle writer Hayley Spencer deemed it "Swift's most cinematic video to date."

Several images in the video featuring silhouettes of Swift's head overlaid by other scenes of her lover, the forests, smoking clouds, or thunder storms, were compared to the opening credits of the crime drama series True Detective. The Wall Street Journal Michael Driscoll, meanwhile, compared the video's atmosphere to that of 1980s pop videos, specifically Chris Isaak's 1989 single "Wicked Game". Mikael Wood of the Los Angeles Times labelled the visual "a creepy homage" to David Lynch's mystery film Mulholland Drive (2001).

Live performances and other usage

Swift first performed "Style" live as part of the "1989 Secret Session", which took place on the rooftop of the Empire State Building and was broadcast live by Yahoo! and iHeartRadio on October 27, 2014. On December 2, she performed the song along with "Blank Space" at the Victoria's Secret Fashion Show 2014 in London. "Style" was included on the set list for Swift's headlining 2015 world tour in support of 1989. Swift also included the song on the set list for her 2018 Reputation Stadium Tour, where it was part of a medley with "Love Story" and "You Belong with Me".

On April 23, 2019, Swift performed an acoustic version of the song at the Lincoln Center for the Performing Arts during the Time 100 Gala, where she was honored as one of the "100 most influential people" of the year. Swift again performed the song on the Wango Tango festival on June 1, during the Amazon Prime Day concert on July 10, and at the City of Lover one-day concert in Paris on September 9, 2019. The song was performed on the Eras Tour (2023).

Rock singer Ryan Adams covered "Style" on his 2015 track-by-track cover album of Swift's 1989. Adams changed the original James Dean-referenced lyric to "You've got that Daydream Nation look in your eye", a tribute to 1980s rock band Sonic Youth. He also incorporated rock-oriented styles, which were compared to works by Irish rock band U2 and its lead singer Bono. Annie Zaleski of The A.V. Club deemed it a standout on Adams's 1989, praising the cover as a "yearning, '80s college rock fever dream with snarling punk stabs". Slant Magazines Jeremy Winograd, by contrast, called the version "a bad U2 song."

Credits and personnel

Credits are adapted from the liner notes of 1989.
 Taylor Swift – vocals, background vocals, songwriter
 Max Martin – producer, songwriter, keyboard
 Shellback – producer, songwriter, keyboard, programming, additional guitars
 Ali Payami – producer, songwriter, keyboard, programming
 Michael Ilbert – recording
 Niklas Ljungfelt – guitar
 Sam Holland – recording
 Cory Bice – assistant recording
 Serban Ghenea – mixing
 John Hanes – engineered for mix
 Tom Coyne – mastering

Charts

Weekly charts

Year-end charts

Certifications

Release history

See also

 List of Billboard Adult Contemporary number ones of 2015
 List of Billboard Hot 100 top-ten singles in 2015
 List of Billboard Mainstream Top 40 number-one songs of 2015
 List of number-one singles of 2015 (South Africa)

References

External links
 

2015 singles
2014 songs
Taylor Swift songs
Big Machine Records singles
Republic Records singles
Universal Music Group singles
Songs written by Taylor Swift
Songs written by Shellback (record producer)
Songs written by Max Martin
Song recordings produced by Shellback (record producer)
Song recordings produced by Max Martin
South African Airplay Chart number-one singles
Songs written by Ali Payami
Ryan Adams songs
American pop rock songs
American synth-pop songs
Song recordings produced by Ali Payami